The Egyptian national basketball team is organized and run by the Egyptian Basketball Federation.

Winning the title of the  EuroBasket 1949 is its most celebrated achievement. In addition its 5th-place finish at the 1950 FIBA World Championship as well as its 9th-place finish at the 1952 Summer Olympics, remain the best results ever of an African nation at each tournament. The title of the EuroBasket 1949, is the most prestigious basketball title of an African nation as well. At the FIBA Africa Championship, Egypt holds a record number of 17 medals (alongside Angola). Egypt joined the International Federation of Basketball (FIBA) in 1934 and has Africa's longest basketball tradition.

History

EuroBasket 1937

The Egyptians finished last at the second European basketball championship, the EuroBasket 1937 held by FIBA Europe continental federation.  They had lost their first two preliminary round games against Estonia and Lithuania before withdrawing from the tournament.  Their remaining matches were lost by default, including the final preliminary match, the classification semi-final, and the 7th/8th playoff.

EuroBasket 1947
Egypt was much more successful in their next appearance, the EuroBasket 1947.  They won all three of their preliminary group matches and their first semi-final group game.  Their only loss of the tournament came to eventual gold medallist Soviet Union in the second semi-final group game, before Egypt won their third.  Their 2–1 record in the semi-final group placed them second and set up a bronze medal match against Belgium, whom Egypt had defeated in the preliminary round.  Egypt won again in a close 50–48 match, winning their first European medal.

EuroBasket 1949
The following championship was both hosted and won by Egypt. In a relatively small event with seven teams, none of which had placed better than third previously (France and Egypt had both done so), the Egyptians had little trouble winning their first five games.  By the luck of the draw, Egypt did not face France until the last game of the tournament, so while the standings were based entirely on the seven-team round robin, the two undefeated teams found themselves facing each other in the last game of the tournament.  Dominating 36–16 after the first half, the Egyptians added another point to their lead in the second half to win the game 57–36. The star player and captain was Albert Tadros. Overall, some of the prominent players include winners of the event were Tadros & Hussain Montasser. Later, Tadros was honored as the best player and Montasser was the top-scorer.

EuroBasket 1953
In Moscow, the Egyptian team once again competed. The EuroBasket 1953 saw the Egypt squad win their preliminary group easily, scoring more points in the round than anyone save the Soviet Union and Bulgaria, the latter of which had had one more game than Egypt.  The final round was less conducive to Egyptian success, however; they defeated only Italy on their way to a 1–6 record.  Their six losses included a forfeit to Israel, whom Egypt refused to play.  The squad took 8th place of the 8 teams in the final round and 17 overall.

Later years
In much later years Mohammed Sayed-Soliman Known as Salaawa was the 1984 Olympic Games top-scorer.

In the aftermath of the Egyptian Revolution of 2011, several of Egypt's elite players did not compete at the 2011 FIBA Africa Championship. Most notably, Omar Orabi, the Egyptian American Omar Samhan, and Ahmad Ismail all star forward in the Lebanese Basketball League.

Performance table

Olympic Games
Egypt withdrew from the 1972 tournament following the events of the Munich massacre. At the 1976 Olympics, Egypt withdrew after one game following the boycott of several African countries against New Zealand.

FIBA World Cup

FIBA EuroBasket
Between 1937 and 1953, Egypt competed in the European Championship.

FIBA Africa Championship
Egypt has won a record 17 medals at the AfroBasket (formerly the African Championship) and is tied for second for most titles (5), trailing Angola. Egypt hosted the tournament a record six times, winning a medal in each of those tournaments including four gold medals.
 Champions  
 Runners-up  
 Third place  
 Fourth place

African Games
1965 : 
1973 : 
1991 : 
1995 : 
1999 : 
2007 : 
2011 : 5th
2015 : 
2019 :

Pan Arab Games
1953 : 
1957 : ?
1961 : 
1965 : 
1976 : ?
1985 : ?
1992 : ?
1997 : ?
1999 : 
2004 : 
2007 : 
2011 :

Mediterranean Games
 1951 Alexandria: 
 1959 Beirut: 
 1979 Split: 
 2005 Almería: 5th 
 2013 Mersin: 6th
 2018 Tarragona: Did not enter
 2022 Oran  : 9th

Team

Current roster
Team for the AfroBasket 2021.

Depth chart

Notable players
Other current notable players from Egypt:

Head coach history

Past rosters
1947 EuroBasket: finished 3rd among 14 teams

Albert Tadros, Gabriel "Gaby" Catafago, Youssef Abbas, Fouad Abdelmeguid el-Kheir, Abdelrahman Ismail, Hussein Montasser, Wahid Saleh, Zaki Harari, Hassan Moawad, Zaki Yehia, Guido Acher, Maurice Calife

EuroBasket 1949: finished 1st among 7 teams

Gabriel "Gaby" Catafago, Albert Tadros, Youssef Abouaouf, Fouad Abdelmeguid el-Kheir, Abdelrahman Ismail, Hussein  Montasser, Nessim Salah el-Dine, Wahid Saleh, Medhat Youssef, Mohammed Soliman, Youssef Abbas, Mohammed Ali el-Rashidi (Coach: Carmine "Nello" Paratore), Team captain: Albert Tadros

Team for the 2014 FIBA Basketball World Cup.

Team for the 2015 FIBA Africa Championship.

See also
Egypt national under-19 basketball team
Egypt national under-17 basketball team
Egypt women's national basketball team
Egypt national 3x3 team

References

External links

FIBA profile
Egypt Basketball Records at FIBA Archive
Afrobasket – Egypt Men National Team

 

Men's national basketball teams
Basketball in Egypt
FIBA EuroBasket-winning countries
Basketball
1934 establishments in Egypt